Nandyal is a city and District headquarters of Nandyal district of the Indian state of Andhra Pradesh. It is a municipality and the headquarters of Nandyal mandal in Nandyal revenue division.

Demographics 
In the 2011 census of India, Nandyal had a population of 211,424 making it the 13th most populous town in the state.

Governance

Civic administration 

Nandyal municipality was constituted in the year 1899.

Culture and tourism 

Nandyal is surrounded by nine sacred temples known as the Nava Nandi. Sri Yaganti Uma Maheswara Temple near Nandyal has one of the largest Nandi idols of the world. Nandyal District also consists of Belum Caves, Mahanandi and Srisailam.

Climate

Economy 
The city is a major hub of industry and agriculture. It is rich in natural resources like marble. There are many rice mills and oil mills and Cotton mills and industries which produce milk, soft drinks, sugar, PVC pipes, etc. Some of the renowned industries in the City are the Vijaya Dairy, Nandi Dairy, Nandi Pipes, Nandi Polymers, S. P. Y. Agro, Nandi Steels, etc.

Transport 
The Andhra Pradesh State Road Transport Corporation operates bus services from Nandyal bus station. 
 Junction Railway Station is administered under Guntur railway division of South Central Railways.
Kurnool Airport is 50 km from Nandyal.

Education
The primary and secondary school education is imparted by government, aided and private schools, under the School Education Department of the state.

See also 
 List of cities in Andhra Pradesh by population
 List of municipal corporations in Andhra Pradesh
 Maseedupuram

References 

Cities and towns in Nandyal district